Louvois may refer to: 

 Louvois, Marne, a French commune
 François-Michel le Tellier, Marquis de Louvois (1641–1691), French secretary of state for war
 Camille le Tellier de Louvois (1675–1718), French clergyman, son of the marquis
 Jehan de Louvois (13th century), French trouvère
 Fontaine Louvois, monumental public fountain in Paris
 Fort Louvois, 17th-century fortification on the Atlantic coast of France
 Louvois (horse)